Gautala Autramghat Sanctuary is a protected area of Maharashtra state, India. It lies in the Satmala and Ajantha hill ranges of the Western Ghats, and administratively is in Chhatrapati Sambhaji Nagar District and Jalgaon District. The wildlife sanctuary was established in 1986 in an existing reserved forest area.

Its name comes the nearby village of Gautala, which was itself named after Gautam Rishi, a Hindu ascetic mentioned in the Ramcharitmanas.

Ecology
The area is southern tropical dry deciduous forest with interspersed bush and grasslands.This topography supports wide variety of flora and fauna

Fauna
The wildlife include wide variety of animals. They are chinkara (Gazella bennettii), nilgai (antelope) (Boselaphus tragocamelus), sloth bears (Melursus ursinus), jungle cat (Felis chaus), leopard cat (Prionailurus bengalensis), brown palm civet (Paradoxurus jerdoni), muntjac (barking deer) (Muntiacus muntjak), hare (Lepus nigricollis), leopard, fox, jackal, bats, wild boar, gray langur (Semnopithecus entellus), wolf (Canis lupus pallipes) and  dhole (wild dog) (Cuon alpinus).  240 bird species have been observed in and around the sanctuary, among them are cranes, spoonbills, storks, ibis, pochards, peafowl, quail, partridges, and various species of wading birds. Snakes include the cobra (Naja naja), common krait (Bungarus caeruleus), and rat snake (Ptyas mucosus).

Flora
The hill tops in the sanctuary are grass lands where as most of the forest  trees occur on the slopes.Trees include teak (Tectona grandis), anjan (Hardwickia binata), oil cake tree (Albizia amara), sandalwood (Santalum album), bel (Aegle marmelos), awla (Phyllanthus emblica), bhallatak (Semecarpus anacardium), and moha (Madhuca longifolia).

How to reach
The sanctuary is well connected by road. It is about 75 km from Chhatrapati Sambhaji Nagar and 40 km from Chalisgaon city. The nearest rail head is Chalisgaon and airport is at Chhatrapati Sambhaji Nagar also nearby towns Kannad City from where 2 to 3 Bus are available from Kannad in a day.

Features
 Pitalkhora caves, rock-cut, Buddhist caves, from the 2nd century BCE to 1st century CE
 Patnadevi Temple
 Mahadeva Temple
 Sita Khori a waterfall
Hanuman (Maruti) mandir road side...

Notes

Central Deccan Plateau dry deciduous forests
Wildlife sanctuaries in Maharashtra
Jalgaon district
1986 establishments in Maharashtra
Protected areas established in 1986
Tourist attractions in Maharashtra